Cameron Thompson may refer to:

 Cameron Thompson (footballer) (born 2000), English professional footballer
 Cameron Thompson (politician) (born 1960), Australian politician